Stolker is a surname. It may refer to:

Carel Stolker (born 1954), Dutch university administrator and professor
Jan Stolker (1724–1785), Dutch printmaker, painter, painting dealer, and art collector
Michel Stolker (1933–2018), Dutch racing cyclist

See also
Stolkertsijver, a town in the Commewijne District of Suriname